The vessels below were listed in 1798 as serving the Bombay Marine, the naval arm of the British East India Company (EIC). The list of names and armaments comes from the Bombay Almanack and Register for 1798. Most of the vessels, especially the ones for which we have a burthen, were built for the EIC at the Bombay Dockyard.

Citations

References
 
 
 
 
 
 

Ships of the British East India Company
Naval history
Bombay Marine